Avenida de los Castros is one of the principal thoroughfares of the northern Spanish city of Santander. It runs from the Sardinero beach west past the principal campus buildings of the Universidad de Cantabria. Avenida de los Castros, for much of its length, lies to the south of the La Parque de las Llamas, a large public park.

Roads in Spain
Santander, Spain